Hebrew Technical Institute was a vocational high school in New York City. The school was founded on January 7, 1884 and closed in 1939.

After completing two years at the school, students could specialize in wood-working, pattern making, metal working, instrument making, mechanical drawing, architectural drawing, wood carving, free-hand drawing or applied electricity.

The school was founded after three Hebrew charity organizations formed a committee to promote technical education for the many Jewish immigrants arriving in New York at the time. The school originally opened at 206 East Broadway. After a number of relocations, the school moved into 34 and 36 Stuyvesant Street.

Notable alumni
 Bern Dibner, founder of the Burndy Corporation, graduated ca. 1916. Also a book collector and scholar in the history of science, founder of the Burndy Library.
 Irving Fierstein (1915- 2009), artist
 Marty Friedman (1889–1986), Hall of Fame pro basketball player and coach
 Arthur Hamerschlag, first President of Carnegie Mellon University, class of 1889.
 Nehemiah Persoff, actor.

References

External links
 1937 Graduation Program, outside and inside
 Shopwork leaflets, metalwork, 1909
 "Senior E" class photo, 1937
 Poster of students and faculty, 1937
 Photo: Vocational guidance, Hebrew Technical Institute, circa 1920

Educational institutions established in 1884
Defunct schools in New York City
1939 disestablishments in New York (state)
Private high schools in Manhattan
1884 establishments in New York (state)